The 1999 Thalgo Australian Women's Hardcourts doubles was the doubles event of the third edition of the Thalgo Australian Women's Hardcourts; a WTA Tier III tournament held in the Gold Coast. Elena Likhovtseva and Ai Sugiyama were the defending champions but lost in the first round to Anke Huber and Mary Pierce.

Corina Morariu and Larisa Neiland won in the final 6–3, 6–3 against Kristine Kunce and Irina Spîrlea.

Seeds

  Elena Likhovtseva /  Ai Sugiyama (first round)
  Mariaan de Swardt /  Elena Tatarkova (first round)
  Corina Morariu /  Larisa Neiland (champions)
  Sabine Appelmans /  Patty Schnyder (quarterfinals, withdrew)

Draw

Qualifying

Seeds

  Rika Hiraki /  Svetlana Krivencheva (first round)
  Maureen Drake /  Mashona Washington (first round)

Qualifiers

 ''' Evie Dominikovic /  Cindy Watson

Qualifying draw

External links
1999 Thalgo Australian Women's Hardcourts Doubles draw

Doubles